Maslenitsa (also known as Butter Lady,  Butter Week, Crepe week, or Cheesefare Week) is an Eastern Slavic religious and folk holiday which has retained a number of elements of Slavic mythology in its ritual. It is celebrated during the last week before Great Lent; that is, the eighth week before Eastern Orthodox Pascha. 

The date of Maslenitsa changes every year, depending on the date of the celebration of Easter. It corresponds to the Western Christian Carnival, except that Orthodox Lent begins on a Monday instead of a Wednesday, and the Orthodox date of Easter can differ greatly from the Western Christian date.

The traditional attributes of the Maslenitsa celebration are the Maslenitsa effigy, sleigh rides, and festivities. Russians bake bliny and flatbread, while Belarusians and Ukrainians cook pierogi and syrniki.

Traditions
According to archeological evidence from 2nd century A.D., Maslenitsa may be the oldest surviving Slavic holiday. 
In the Christian tradition, Maslenitsa is the last week before the onset of Great Lent.

During the week of Maslenitsa, meat is already forbidden to Orthodox Christians, and it is the last week during which eggs, milk, cheese and other dairy products are permitted, leading to its name of "Cheese-fare week" or "Crepe week". The most characteristic food of Maslenitsa is bliny - thin pancakes or crêpes, made from the rich foods still allowed by the Orthodox tradition that week: butter, eggs and milk. 

Since Lent excludes parties, secular music, dancing and other distractions from spiritual life, Maslenitsa represents the last chance to take part in social activities that are not appropriate during the more prayerful, sober and introspective Lenten season.

In some regions, each day of Maslenitsa had its traditional activity. Monday may be the welcoming of "Lady Maslenitsa". The community builds the Maslenitsa effigy out of straw, decorated with pieces of rags, and fixed to a pole formerly known as Kostroma. It is paraded around, and the first pancakes may be made and offered to the poor. On Tuesday, young men might search for a fiancée to marry after Lent. On Wednesday, sons-in-law may visit their mother-in-law, who has prepared pancakes and invited other guests for a party. Thursday may be devoted to outdoor activities. People may take off work and spend the day sledding, ice skating, snowball fights and with sleigh rides. On Friday, sons-in-law may invite their mothers-in-law for dinner.  Saturday may be a gathering of a young wife with her sisters-in-law to work on a good relationship.

Sunday of Forgiveness

The last day of Cheesefare Week is called "Forgiveness Sunday" (Прощёное воскресенье). Relatives and friends ask each other for forgiveness and might offer them small presents. As the culmination of the celebration, people gather to "strip Lady Maslenitsa of her finery" and burn her in a bonfire. Left-over pancakes may also be thrown into the fire, and Lady Maslenitsa's ashes are buried in the snow to "fertilize the crops".

At Vespers on Sunday evening, people may make a poklon (bow) before one another and ask forgiveness. Another name for Forgiveness Sunday is "Cheesefare Sunday", because for devout Orthodox Christians it is the last day on which dairy products may be consumed until Easter. Fish, wine and olive oil will also be forbidden on most days of Great Lent. The day following Cheesefare Sunday is called Clean Monday, because people have confessed their sins, asked forgiveness, and begun Great Lent with a clean slate.

Modern times

Due to cultural factors in the Russian Empire, large public celebrations of Maslenitsa were no longer as common by the turn of the 20th century. After the Russian Revolution in 1917 and the following state atheism in the Soviet Union, public Maslenitsa celebrations became even less common, although Maslenitsa continued to observed particularly in smaller private celebrations in homes and villages. In the 1960s and 1970s, as the USSR brought back some traditional folk holidays, Maslenitsa was again observed in large public celebrations that retained some of the holiday's secular elements, but with additional "contemporary socialist elements grafted onto it".

After the start of perestroika and fall of the Soviet Union in the 1980s and 1990s, large outdoor celebrations began to be start up again, and much of the older Maslenitsa traditions began to be revived in a modern context. Since 2002, Moscow has staged a yearly Maslenitsa festival next to the Red Square, with that and other celebrations attracting around 300,000 visitors a year as of 2011. 

With increasing secularization, many Russians do not abstain from meat and Maslenitsa celebrations can be accompanied by shashlik vendors. Nevertheless, "meat still does not play a major role in the festivities". Many countries with a significant number of Russian immigrants consider Maslenitsa a suitable occasion to celebrate Russian culture, although the celebrations are usually reduced to one day and may not coincide with the date of the religious celebrations.

Gallery

See also
Candlemas
Slavic carnival
Fašiangy (in Slovakia)
Rio Carnival (in Brazil)
Carnaval (in the Netherlands)
Fat Thursday (in Poland)
Mardi Gras (in other countries)
Mărţişor (in Romania and Moldova)
Marzanna (in Poland)
Meteņi (in Latvia)
Patras Carnival (in Greece)
Tsiknopempti
Shrove Tuesday or "Pancake Day" (in the United Kingdom and Ireland)
Petrushka (ballet)
Užgavėnės (in Lithuania)
Farsang (Hungarian carnival)
Shrovetide

References

External links

Lives of the Saints The Orthodox Church in America, undated.
  

Eastern Orthodox liturgical days
Observances in Russia
Mardi Gras
Russian folklore
Russian traditions
Russian Orthodox Church
Spring traditions
February observances
March observances 
Ukrainian traditions
Belarusian traditions
Folk calendar of the East Slavs
Holidays based on the date of Easter
Slavic holidays
Slavic carnival
Carnivals in Russia
Carnivals in Ukraine
Carnivals in Belarus
Festivals in Russia
Festivals in Ukraine
Spring (season) events in Belarus